Music from Free Creek is an album from a series of 1969 "super session" recordings by Free Creek, a group composed of a number of internationally renowned musical artists of the time, including Jeff Beck, Eric Clapton, Keith Emerson, Buzz Feiten, Mitch Mitchell and Linda Ronstadt.  Joe Viglione from www.allmusic.com has stated that "Music from Free Creek is a super session album, where the musicians are playing for the fun of it, and that comes across. The material doesn't get bogged down in 'names'; it just flows."

History 

The recordings, made in 1969, were released in 1973 in England as CADS 101 by Charisma Records and in the U.S. by Buddah Records, as a two-record set.  The material was re-released by Charisma in 1976, as Summit Meeting.  It was released on CD by Lake Eerie Records in 2002, and re-released by the same company in 2006.

Track Listing and Personnel
Source:

The Eric Clapton ("King Cool") Session
Source:

1. No One Knows      
(lyrics by Tom Cosgrove and Stu Woods, music by Moogy Klingman)

Guitar - Eric Clapton (as "King Cool")
Lead Vocal - Eric Mercury
Organ - Dr. John
Piano - Moogy Klingman
Bass - Stu Woods
Drums - Richard Crooks
The Free Creek Horns & The Free Creek Singers

2. Road Song (Klingman)

Lead Guitar - Eric Clapton
Piano - Dr. John
Lead Vocals - Tom Cosgrove and Buzzy Linhart
Organ - Moogy Klingman
Rhythm Guitar - Delaney Bramlett
Bass - Stu Woods
Drums - Richard Crooks

3. Getting Back To Molly (Klingman)

Guitars - Eric Clapton (1st solo), Dr. John (2nd solo)
Lead Vocal - Earle Doude
Harmonica - Moogy Klingman
The Free Creek Singers

The Jeff Beck ("A.N. Other") Session
Source:

4. Cissy Strut  
(A. Neville, L. Nocentelli, G. Porter, Jr. and J. Modeliste)

Guitars - Jeff Beck (1st solo, as "A.N. Other"), Todd Rundgren (2nd solo)
Organ - Moogy Klingman
Bass - Stu Woods
Drums - Roy Markowitz
The Free Creek Horns

5. Big City Woman (Klingman)

Guitar - Jeff Beck
Piano - Moogy Klingman
Bass - Stu Woods
Drums - Roy Markowitz
Lead Vocal - Tommy Cosgrove

6. Cherrypicker 
(Jeff Beck, Moogy Klingman, Stu Woods and Roy Markowitz)

Guitars - Jeff Beck, Todd Rundgren
Organ - Moogy Klingman
Bass - Stu Woods
Drums - Roy Markowitz

7. Working in a Coalmine (Written by Allen Toussaint)

Guitar - Jeff Beck
Organ - Moogy Klingman, Bob Smith
Bass - Stu Woods
Drums - Roy Markowitz

The Keith Emerson Session

8. Freedom Jazz Dance (Eddie Harris)

Hammond Organ - Keith Emerson
Guitar - Buzzy Feiten
Drums - Mitch Mitchell
Piano - Moogy Klingman
Bass - Chuck Rainey

9. On the Rebound (Floyd Cramer)

Piano - Keith Emerson
Guitar - Buzzy Feiten
Bass - Chuck Rainey
Drums - Mitch Mitchell
Occasional Voice - Geri Miller

10. Mother Nature's Son (Lennon and McCartney)

Piano - Keith Emerson
Acoustic Guitar - Carol Hunter
Oboe - Lou Delgato
String Bass - Richard Davis

The Harvey Mandel Session

11. Sympathy for the Devil (Jagger/Richards)

Lead Guitar - Harvey Mandel
Rhythm Guitar - Jack Wilkens
Organ - Moogy Klingman
Piano - Jimmy Greenspoon
Bass - Larry Taylor
Violin - Larry Packer
Drums - Fito de la Parra
Congas - Billy Chesboro
Bongos - Didymus

12. Earl's Shuffle (Harvey Mandel and Earle Doud)

Lead Guitar - Harvey Mandel
Pedal Steel Guitar - Red Rhodes
Organ - Jimmy Greenspoon
Bass - Larry Taylor
Drums - Fito de la Parra

13. The Girl from Ipanema (Antonio Carlos Jobim and Norman Gimbel)

Lead Guitar - Harvey Mandel
Pedal Steel Guitar - Red Rhodes
Bass - Larry Taylor
Drums - Fito de la Parra
Shakers - Didymus
Wood Blocks - Earle Doud

Odds & Sods

14. Hey Jude (Lennon and McCartney)

Lead Guitar - Buzzy Feiten
Organ - Moogy Klingman
Drums - Mitch Mitchell
Bass - Richard Davis
Rhythm Guitar - Elliot Randall
The Free Creek Horns

15. Lay Lady Lay (Dylan)

Flutes - Joe Farrell (solo), Chris Wood
Piano - Moogy Klingman
Guitar - Doug Rodriguez
Bass - Stu Woods
Drums - Roy Markowitz

16. Kilpatrick's Defeat (Moogy Klingman and Mike Gayle)

Lead Vocal - Timmy Harrison
Guitars - Carol Hunter and Buzzy Feiten
Bass - Stu Woods

The Linda Ronstadt Session

17. Living Like a Fool (Maxwell and Crutchfield)

Lead Vocal - Linda Ronstadt
Guitar - Bernie Leadon
Pedal Steel Guitar - Red Rhodes
Piano - Jimmy Greenspoon
Bass - John London
Drums - John Ware

18. He Darked the Sun (Bernie Leadon and Gene Clark)

Lead Vocal - Linda Ronstadt
Guitar - Bernie Leadon
Pedal Steel Guitar - Red Rhodes
Piano - Jimmy Greenspoon
Bass - John London
Drums - John Ware
Violin - Chris Darrow

The Free Creek Horns are:

Lou Delgato
Bobby Keller
Meco Monardo
Tom Malone
Lew Soloff
Alan Rubin
Bill Chase

The Free Creek Singers are:

Valerie Simpson
Maeretha Stewart
Hilda Harris

Other Credits and Particulars 

Music from Free Creek was recorded and mixed in New York City at The Record Plant, June, July &  August, 1969

Produced by Earle Doud and Tom Flye 
Executive Producer and Musical Director: Moogy Klingman 
Engineers: Tony Bongiovi and Jack Hunt 
Additional mixes: Keith Emerson and Neil Slaven 
Album cover painting by Ronchetti and Day
Album cover design: Hipgnosis

Track listing 

The UK release of the double LP arranges the tracks in the following order:

LP 1, side A (ADS1A, stated running time 17:52)
Cissy Strut
Freedom Jazz Dance
Sympathy for the Devil
Mother Nature's Son
Road Song

LP1, side B (ADS1B, stated running time 15:50)
Lay Lady Lay
Hey Jude
He Darked the Sun
Earl's Shuffle

LP2, side A (ADS2A, stated running time 17:21)
Getting Back to Molly
Cherrypicker
Kilpatrick's Defeat
Girl from Ipanema
No One Knows

LP2, side B (ADS2B, stated running time 15:42)
Living Like a Fool
Working in a Coalmine
Big City Woman
On the Rebound

The 2006 Lake Eerie single CD Free Creek LER 43014 has the same 18 tracks in the same order from LP1 side A through to LP2 side B, with some minor variations in track titles and musician credits.

References 

1973 albums